Begal May refer to:

 Begal, Punjab, Chakwal Tehsil, Chakwal District, Pakistan
 Begal, FATA, Salarzai Tehsil, Bajaur Agency, Pakistan